Maray Qalla (Quechua maran, maray batan or grindstone, maray to tear down, to knock down, qalla carved stone, cobblestone; circular spindle disk; cheek, also spelled Maraycalla, Maraycalle) is an archaeological site in Peru. It is situated in the Ancash Region, Carlos Fermín Fitzcarrald Province. Maray Qalla lies at a section of the Qhapaq Ñan, the Inca road system.

References 

Archaeological sites in Ancash Region
Archaeological sites in Peru
Inca